Charles Hardaway Marks (January 31, 1921 – November 13, 2004) was an American attorney and politician.

Political career
Marks, a Democrat served as a member of the Virginia House of Delegates from 1962 to 1991 where he represented the people of the City of Hopewell, and the counties of Prince George, Charles City, and at times, Surry.
As a member of the General Assembly, Mr. Marks initiated the legislation which provided state recognition for eight Virginia Indian tribes and created the Virginia Indian Commission. He served as the commission's first chairman. He was honored by the Standing Bear Award presented to him for his work on behalf of the Virginia Indian community. He was the founding chairman of the Virginia Alcohol Safety Action Program (VASAP) and he received its Distinguished Service Award in 2000. When he retired from the House of Delegates; he was second in seniority and he chaired the Courts of Justice Committee. He was also a member and past chairman of the Corporations, Insurance and Banking Committee and he served on the Privileges and Elections and the Rules Committees.

Background
Born in Hopewell, Virginia, Marks graduated from Hopewell High School in 1940 and earned a bachelor's degree from Wake Forest University; he also attended Duke University and University of Virginia Law School. Marks was a founding partner of the Marks & Harrison law firm and was a member of the Virginia State Bar for 50 years. In 1987, he received the Distinguished Service Award from the Virginia Trial Lawyers Association.  He was also involved in commercial, retail, and residential real estate development; the creation of several finance companies and two local banks which eventually became part of Wachovia; and farming.

Marks died in Prince George, Virginia after a long illness.  Marks was a veteran of World War II and had served as a captain in the United States Marine Corps. He was wounded during the Battle of Iwo Jima, for which he received the Purple Heart.  He was a longtime member of Merchant's Hope Church in Prince George.

Legacy
In 1998 the Charles Hardaway Marks Bridges spanning the Appomattox River between Hopewell and Chesterfield were named in his honor.

References

1921 births
2004 deaths
People from Hopewell, Virginia
Wake Forest University alumni
Duke University alumni
University of Virginia School of Law alumni
Virginia lawyers
Democratic Party members of the Virginia House of Delegates
20th-century American politicians
20th-century American lawyers
United States Marine Corps personnel of World War II